Dorvalino Alves Maciel (born 1 June 1977), known as Lino, is a Brazilian former footballer who played as a left back.

Club career

Early years / Portugal
Born in São Paulo, Lino represented several clubs in his country's Série A. In 2003 he scored five goals for Esporte Clube Bahia, but his team ranked dead last.

In 2006, Lino moved to Portugal, signing for Académica de Coimbra. He only missed one game in his first and only season, but the side only narrowly avoided relegation. He subsequently joined fellow league club FC Porto, appearing rarely during his spell but scoring in a 3–1 home win against Fenerbahçe S.K. for the campaign's UEFA Champions League.

PAOK
In the 2009 January transfer window, Lino signed for PAOK FC in the Superleague Greece. He was selected team MVP in 2013–14, surpassing Stefanos Athanasiadis and Miroslav Stoch.
PAOK signed him from Porto at age 32. From January 2009 to July 2014 he was first-team regular and left his mark on the club, earning his place as one of the best foreign players to wear a PAOK shirt. He played 220 times, scoring 16 goals, while also contributing 41 assists – making his performances a benchmark for those who followed him.

Career statistics

Club

Honours
Porto
Primeira Liga: 2007–08, 2008–09
Taça de Portugal: 2008–09

PAOK
Super League Greece: Runner up 2012–13, 2013–14
Greek Football Cup: Runner up 2013–14

Individual
PAOK MVP of the Season: 2012-13, 2013–14
Super League Greece Team of the Year: 2011–12

References

External links

1977 births
Living people
Footballers from São Paulo
Brazilian footballers
Association football defenders
Campeonato Brasileiro Série A players
Associação Desportiva São Caetano players
Iraty Sport Club players
São Paulo FC players
Figueirense FC players
Esporte Clube Bahia players
Fluminense FC players
Marília Atlético Clube players
Esporte Clube Juventude players
Londrina Esporte Clube players
Primeira Liga players
Associação Académica de Coimbra – O.A.F. players
FC Porto players
Super League Greece players
PAOK FC players
Brazilian expatriate footballers
Expatriate footballers in Portugal
Expatriate footballers in Greece
Brazilian expatriate sportspeople in Portugal
Brazilian expatriate sportspeople in Greece
PAOK FC non-playing staff